Gorgeous is the fifth album by the Huntington Beach, California punk rock band Guttermouth, released in 1999 by Nitro Records. It was the band's most aggressive album to date, due in part to a lineup change: bass player Steve Rapp had left the group and drummer James Nunn had taken over his position, making room for new drummer Ty Smith (credited here as T. Bradford). It would also be the band's last album for Nitro, as they moved to Epitaph Records the following year.

Track listing
All songs written by Guttermouth
"Hit Machine" – 1:58
"Encyclopedia Brown – 1:34
"Con Especial – 1:51
"Viva America" – 1:11
"Diamond Studded Bumble Bee" – 1:33
"A Date with Destiny" – 2:19
"The Dreaded Sea Lice Have Come Aboard" – 1:34
"A Nice Place to Visit" – 1:59
"Food Storage" – 2:39
"I Have a Dream" – 2:10
"BBB" – 1:39
"High Balls" – 4:25
"Power Up" (introduction) – 4:02
"Power Up" – 2:51

Personnel
Mark Adkins - vocals
Scott Sheldon - guitar
Eric "Derek" Davis - guitar
"Admiral" James Nunn - bass guitar
T. Bradford (William Tyler "Ty" Smith) - drums

Album information
Record label: Nitro Records
Produced by Guttermouth
Recorded and mixed at Paramount Studios
Engineered by Donnell Cameron and Jim Goodwin
Mixed by Donnell Cameron
Mastered by Eddie Schrayer at Oasis Mastering
Art by Steve Rapp
Cover photo by Monique Pritchard

References 

Guttermouth albums
Nitro Records albums
1999 albums